San Miguel Peras is a town and municipality in Oaxaca in south-western Mexico. The municipality covers an area of 121.2 km². 
It is part of the Zaachila District in the west of the Valles Centrales Region

As of 2005, the municipality had a total population of 3126.

References

Municipalities of Oaxaca